The 26th Arizona State Legislature, consisting of the Arizona State Senate and the Arizona House of Representatives, was constituted in Phoenix from January 1, 1963, to December 31, 1964, during the last of three terms of Paul Fannin's time as Governor of Arizona. The number of senators remained constant at two per county, totaling 28, and the members of the house of representatives also held steady at 80. The Democrats maintained a 24–4 edge in the upper house, while the Republicans gained four seats in the House, trimming the Democrats majority to 48–32.

Sessions
The Legislature met for two regular sessions at the State Capitol in Phoenix. The first opened on January 14, 1963, and adjourned on April 2; while the second convened on January 13, 1964, and adjourned on April 15. There were two Special Sessions, the first of which convened April 4, 1963, and adjourned sine die on April 4; while the second convened on May 27, 1963, and adjourned sine die on June 3.

State Senate

Members

The asterisk (*) denotes members of the previous Legislature who continued in office as members of this Legislature.

House of Representatives

Members 
The asterisk (*) denotes members of the previous Legislature who continued in office as members of this Legislature.

References

Arizona legislative sessions
1963 in Arizona
1964 in Arizona
1963 U.S. legislative sessions
1964 U.S. legislative sessions